World Hockey 95 is a video game developed by American company Merit Studios and published by SoftKey for DOS.

Gameplay
World Hockey 95 features full-motion video commentary and a three-quarter perspective view of the playfield.

Reception
Next Generation reviewed the PC version of the game, rating it one star out of five, and stated that "this game deserves some credit for being the only PC product around that lets you play hockey on the international level.  So, if you are absolutely dying for the ability to play hockey on your PC, and you want a rematch of Team USA vs. Canada, this will suffice ... barely." It received a largely negative review from Computer Game Review; the magazine's Tasos Kaiafas concluded, "Steer clear!"

In 1996, Computer Gaming World declared World Hockey the 26th-worst computer game ever released.

Reviews
PC Gamer Vol. 2 No. 9 (1995 September)
Computer Gaming World (Sep, 1995)
PC Games - Jun, 1995
PC Player - Jul, 1995

References

1995 video games
DOS games
DOS-only games
Ice hockey video games
Merit Studios games
Video games developed in the United States